Sahasram Maruti Korote is an Indian politician from the state of Maharashtra. In 2019, he was elected as MLA representing the Indian National Congress by defeating Sanjay Puram from Bharatiya Janata Party. He was elected from the Amgaon constituency, located in the Gondia district. 

He holds a graduation degree in Bachelor of Arts. By profession, he is a businessman and a social worker.

References

Indian National Congress politicians from Maharashtra
Year of birth missing (living people)
Living people